Padarvand-e Vosta (also Romanized as Pādarvand-e Vosţá; also known as Bādervand-e Vosţá) is a village in Rumiani Rural District, Suri District, Romeshkan County, Lorestan Province, Iran. At the 2006 census, its population was 560, in 104 families.

References 

Populated places in Rumeshkhan County